Marcelo Jorge Fuentes (born 1948 in La Plata) is an Argentine Justicialist Party politician. He was a National Senator for the Neuquén Province for the Frente de Todos. In 2019, Fuentes, became Parliamentary Secretary to the Argentine Senate.

Fuentes graduated as a lawyer from the National University of La Plata in 1973 and became an adviser to the Federation of Rural Workers and later advised other trade unions.

Fuentes was subsecretary of Institutional Relations in the Argentine Foreign Ministry. In 2007 he was elected to the Argentine Senate.

References

External links
Senate profile
Official website

1948 births
Living people
People from La Plata
Members of the Argentine Senate for Neuquén
Justicialist Party politicians